Hurqalya (Second Grand Constitution And Bylaws) is the second studio album by American experimental rock band Secret Chiefs 3, released on April 28, 1998 by Amarillo Records.

Release history 
In 2000, Web of Mimicry remastered and reissued the album on CD bonus tracks "Zulkifar II". In 2011, French label !Angrr! issued the release with a further bonus track on vinyl.

Critical reception 

Greg Prato of AllMusic praised the band for their seamless blending of disparate musical genres and called the album "one of 1998's most rewarding, original, and ambitious recordings." A critic for Ink 19 gave it a mixed review but called the compositions unique but somewhat grating. CMJ New Music Monthly gave the album a positive review and said "though more of an obscurist's delight than a proper metal band, SC3 has enough grindcore drum blasts and highspeed thematic switches to make it interesting to metal minds."

Track listing

Personnel 
Adapted from the Hurqalya (Second Grand Constitution and Bylaws) liner notes.

Secret Chiefs 3
 Danny Heifetz – drums, dumbek, zil, tambourine, shaker
 Trey Spruance – electric guitar, bass guitar, keyboards, organ, mandolin, zither, saz, trumpet, synthesizer, tape, programming, vocals, production, engineering, illustrations, art direction
 William Winant – percussion, kanjira, timpani, cymbal, bells, hammered dulcimer

Additional musicians
 Laura Allen – vocals 
 Eyvind Kang – violin and erhu 
 Clinton "Bär" McKinnon – flute 
 Paul Dal Porto – sitar 

Production and design
 Jai Young Kim – mastering
 Mari Kono – photography
 Margaret Murray – design
 Rebecca Wilson – photography

Release history

References

External links 
 Second Grand Constitution and Bylaws at iTunes
 

1998 albums
Secret Chiefs 3 albums
Web of Mimicry albums
Albums produced by Trey Spruance
Amarillo Records albums